Riverdale Collegiate Institute (Riverdale CI, RCI, or Riverdale) is a semestered high school located in Toronto, Ontario, Canada owned and operated by the Toronto Board of Education until its amalgamation in 1998 into the Toronto District School Board.

History and overview
Riverdale Collegiate was founded in 1907. Then known as Riverdale Technical School, the facility was designed by the architect for the Board of Education, C.E.C. Dyson. In the nineteen-nineties it was extensively renovated but the original facade was maintained.

On May 17, 2006, the first annual United Games were hosted at Riverdale. This was a day-long event also including students from Eastern Commerce, Monarch Park and DCTI. Former NBA star Jerome Williams acted as principal for the day. His activities included a presentation speaking out against violence, barbecuing lunch with students, and overseeing games designed to build relationships between the schools by forming teams with students from all four schools, rather than having a team for each school.

Riverdale provides numerous sports teams and clubs throughout the year. Some big sports include field hockey, swim team, cross country, track and field, volleyball, basketball, soccer, ice hockey, and badminton. There are also many clubs including The Riverdale Athletic Association (RAA), Riverdale Raiders Robotics (R3P2), Riverdale Environmental Action League (R.E.A.L), Free the Children, Students Against Sexual Stereotype Discrimination (SASSD), and the Chinese Culture Club.

Riverdale Collegiate celebrated its centennial on May 12, 2007.

On February 10, 2015, it was reported that the TDSB was launching a review of schools for possible closure. Riverdale Collegiate Institute was incorrectly listed out of a possible seventy schools which the TDSB considers under-used and under review. Riverdale Collegiate Institute was over capacity at 103% at the time of the erroneous news reporting and was included as part of the Pupil Accommodation Review mandated by the Ministry of Education to ensure that "school boards make more efficient use of school space while continuing to ensure that communities have the opportunity to provide meaningful input."

Notable alumni
 Lincoln Alexander – first black Member of Parliament and 24th Lieutenant-Governor of Ontario
 Carl Brewer – NHL defenseman 
 Morley Callaghan – writer
 Megan Crewe – young adult writer
 Punch Imlach – Hall of Fame ice hockey coach and general manager
 Michael Ironside – actor
 Tom Pashby – Canadian ophthalmologist, sport safety advocate, and inductee into Canada's Sports Hall of Fame
 Gordon Sinclair – writer and TV personality
 Ron Stewart – Canadian football league player

See also
List of high schools in Ontario

References

External links
 Riverdale Collegiate Institute

High schools in Toronto
Schools in the TDSB
Educational institutions established in 1907
1907 establishments in Ontario